Raja Wodeyar II (26 May 1612 – 8 October 1638) was the eleventh maharaja of the Kingdom of Mysore for about a year from 1637 to 1638. He was fourth son of Maharaja Raja Wodeyar I.

Accession and death 
Raja Wodeyar II's reign was brief. When he ascended the throne after Chamaraja Wodeyar VI's death in 1637, he was only 25, younger than his predecessor nephew. However, he was poisoned on the orders of his dalvoys (commanders-in-chief) in 1638, just after a year after coronation. He was succeeded by his cousin, Kanthirava Narasaraja I.

See also
 Wodeyar dynasty

External links
 Mysore Palace and the Wodeyar Dynasty

1612 births
1638 deaths
Kings of Mysore
Raja II
17th-century Indian monarchs